Corozo may refer to:

Places:
 A village in Bluefields municipality, Nicaragua
 A village in San José de los Remates municipality, Nicaragua
 A river in the Dominican Republic
 Several villages in Ocozocoautla de Espinosa municipality, Mexico

Plants:
 Acrocomia media, a grugru palm
 Aiphanes horrida, a ruffle palm
 Attalea, an American oil palm genus
 Elaeis, the main commercial oil palm genus
 Maranthes panamensis, a Chrysobalanaceae shrub
 The endosperm of Phytelephas palm seeds ("vegetable ivory")

People:
 Dennis Corozo, Ecuadorian footballer playing for Centro Deportivo Olmedo
 Felipe Salvador Caicedo Corozo, Ecuadorian footballer playing for Manchester City F.C.
 Franklin Corozo, Ecuadorian footballer playing for Sociedad Deportivo Quito
 Luis Corozo, Peruvian footballer playing for FBC Melgar
 Rixon Javier Corozo Hurtado, Ecuadorian Footballer playing for Club Deportivo El Nacional
 Walter Orlando Ayoví Corozo, Ecuadorian footballer playing for Club Deportivo El Nacional 
 Yason Corozo, Ecuadorian footballer playing for Club Social y Deportivo Macará

See also
 Corozal, Puerto Rico
 Laguna Los Corozos, a lagoon near San Juan, Puerto Rico